Gary Richardson (born February 5, 1941) is an American lawyer who was the United States Attorney for the Eastern District of Oklahoma from 1981 to 1984. He is also a perennial candidate for elected office in Oklahoma. As of 2018 he is a partner in the Richardson Law Firm, P.C., a plaintiff law firm in Tulsa.

Career
Richardson attended college at Southern Nazarene University in Bethany, Oklahoma, and graduated with a B.A. degree and a minor in education in 1963. He attended Oklahoma City University School of Law where he was distinguished with the honor of receiving top grades for First Year Law students.  He also attended the South Texas College of Law in Houston, Texas, and earned his J.D. in 1972.

Richardson was the Republican nominee for the U.S. House of Representatives in Oklahoma's Second Congressional District in 1978 and 1980, both times losing to Democrat Mike Synar.

Richardson served as the United States Attorney for the Eastern District of Oklahoma from 1981 to 1984.  In 1981, along with the U.S. Attorneys for the two other Federal Districts in Oklahoma, Richardson was involved in the prosecution and conviction of 210 County Commissioners who were engaged in a systematic kickback scheme that had been going on for decades.

In 1991 Richardson represented former McLennan County, Texas District Attorney Vic Feazell in a defamation case against Dallas TV station WFAA which resulted in what at that time was the largest libel judgement in U.S. history.

In 2002, Richardson unsuccessfully ran for Governor of Oklahoma as an Independent candidate. He came in third behind the winner, Democratic candidate, Brad Henry, and the Republican candidate, former Congressman Steve Largent. Richardson received a total of 146,200 votes (or 14 percent) of the 1,035,620 votes cast (see a table of this result at ).

On April 23, 2017, Richardson announced that he would be running for the Republican nomination for governor in 2018. In April 2018, Richardson faced criticism for a campaign advertisement intended to promote his stance on illegal immigration. The ad referenced the June 2015 death of Bob Barry Jr., a longtime sports anchor at Oklahoma City NBC affiliate KFOR-TV (channel 4) from 1982 until shortly before his death, in an accident in which his motor scooter collided into a car being driven by Gustavo Gutierrez – an undocumented Mexican immigrant who had thrice been deported from the U.S. prior to the accident – who was conducting an illegal U-turn across two southbound lanes at a northwest Oklahoma City intersection. KFOR/KAUT general manager Wes Milbourn noted that the duopoly was obligated to run the ad as it met FCC campaign advertising requirements, but noted that "we were displeased with their advertising tactics and the exploitation of Bob Barry [Jr.]". In a written statement, Barry's son, Matthew H. Barry, said that "the Barry Family finds it deeply concerning that Mr. Richardson chose to feature the tragic and untimely death of our [f]ather in his campaign advertisement without seeking consent. [... W]e find it very troubling that Mr. Richardson ran an advertisement that could imply that the Barry family endorses in any way his election as Governor of the State of Oklahoma. In sum, the Barry family does not appreciate the liberties taken by Mr. Richardson and his campaign; and condemn the utter lack of respect shown towards our tragic loss.” The primary was held on June 26; Richardson placed sixth in a ten-man primary.

Results

References

External links
 Brief Bio and Legal Resume from MoreLaw.com
 Richardson's Home Page at his law firm
 2002 Oklahoma Governor Election Results from CBS News.
 Gary Richardson's campaign home page.

1941 births
20th-century American lawyers
21st-century American lawyers
American prosecutors
Candidates in the 1978 United States elections
Candidates in the 1980 United States elections
Candidates in the 2002 United States elections
Candidates in the 2018 United States elections
Lawyers from Tulsa, Oklahoma
Living people
Oklahoma City University School of Law alumni
Oklahoma Independents
Oklahoma Republicans
Oklahoma lawyers
People from Bryan County, Oklahoma
South Texas College of Law alumni
Southern Nazarene University alumni
United States Attorneys for the Eastern District of Oklahoma